Edison Properties is a privately owned real estate holding and development firm based in Newark, New Jersey founded in 1956.  The company has holdings in New Jersey, New York City, and Baltimore including many parking lots marketed under ParkFast and storage units marketed under Manhattan Mini Storage. The company is affiliated with the family-run Gottesman Real Estate Partners.

Edison ParkFast
Edison ParkFast operates parking lots in Newark, Manhattan, Brooklyn, Jersey City, Secaucus, and Baltimore.

Manhattan Mini Storage
Manhattan Mini Storage is a self storage and moving company based in New York City. It is the largest personal storage company in New York, and one of the largest in the United States. The firm has 17 storage locations throughout the city, open 365 days a year and some of which are open 24 hours per day. Manhattan Mini Storage has approximately 250,000 clients. Facilities include high-tech security system, free concierge, and onsite managers. It also operates a service with Portero through which customers can "dispose of unwanted valuables that clutter their storage units." The firm conducts blind auctions of the belongings of customers who fail to pay their storage bills.

In 2021, StorageMart acquired Manhattan Mini Storage from Edison Properties for over $3 billion.

Hippodrome
An office building and parking garage built on the site of the New York Hippodrome in 1951-52 uses the name "The Hippodrome Center." Through the 1960s, the modern building was the corporate headquarters of the Charter Communications media publishing company. The building at 1120 Avenue of the Americas between 43rd and 44th Streets in Midtown Manhattan was acquired by the Gottesman family in 1978. A $55 million major modernization of the 21-story building was completed in 2006. Executive Suites offers 160 executive offices, including single rooms and multi-room suites for between one and ten people, and there are also nine conference rooms, accommodating up to 40 people.

The Ludlow
The Ludlow, located at 188 Ludlow Street between Houston and Stanton Streets on the  Lower East Side, New York City, contains 243 residential apartments spanning 23 stories. Completed in 2007, the building’s amenities include a resident’s lounge and billiards room, fitness center and yoga studio, concierge, security system, and building-wide wireless internet system. The building also houses a mini storage location.  It has two commercial retail spaces at street level.  One houses NYC's famous il laboratorio del gelato, a small ice cream factory founded in 2002 on the lower east side.

WorkSpace Offices
WorkSpace Offices, located at 131 Varick Street in the Hudson Square area and at 5030 Broadway, in Inwood, offers 206 units for a less formal but highly entrepreneurial group of users. Offices can accommodate between one and 20 people. Both buildings contain mini storage facilities.

In 2021, StorageMart acquired WorkSpace Offices from Edison Properties as part of the same deal that included Manhattan Mini Storage.

Mulberry Commons

Mulberry Commons is a city square in Newark, around which Edison owns numerous properties, and is a major stakeholder in their development, including Ironside Newark.

Memory Care Facility 
In February 2020, Edison Properties is aiming to join the field of senior care, building an assisted-living home for the aged, and a separate program for people and cognition-impaired disorders such as Alzheimer's which will reside on 1475 Molson St., in Winnipeg's Northeastern Eaglemere neighbourhood.

References

External links 
Edison Properties

Companies based in Newark, New Jersey
Real estate companies established in 1956
Real estate companies of the United States
Privately held companies based in New Jersey
1956 establishments in New Jersey